The 2018 Fuzhou China Open was a badminton tournament which took place at Haixia Olympics Sports Center in Fuzhou, Fujian, China, from 6 to 11 November 2018 and had a total prize of $700,000.

Tournament
The 2018 Fuzhou China Open was the twenty-third tournament of the 2018 BWF World Tour and also part of the Fuzhou China Open (formerly China Masters) championships, which had been held since 2005. This tournament was organized by Chinese Badminton Association and sanctioned by the BWF.

Venue
This international tournament was held at Haixia Olympic Sports Center in Fuzhou, Fujian, China.

Point distribution
Below is the point distribution table for each phase of the tournament based on the BWF points system for the BWF World Tour Super 750 event.

Prize money
The total prize money for this tournament was US$700,000. Distribution of prize money was in accordance with BWF regulations.

Men's singles

Seeds

 Kento Momota (champion)
 Shi Yuqi (semi-finals)
 Viktor Axelsen (withdrew)
 Chou Tien-chen (final)
 Srikanth Kidambi (quarter-finals)
 Chen Long (semi-finals)
 Son Wan-ho (quarter-finals)
 Anthony Sinisuka Ginting (quarter-finals)

Finals

Top half

Section 1

Section 2

Bottom half

Section 3

Section 4

Women's singles

Seeds

 Tai Tzu-ying (withdrew)
 Akane Yamaguchi (second round)
 P. V. Sindhu (quarter-finals)
 Chen Yufei (champion) 
 Carolina Marín (semi-finals)
 Ratchanok Intanon (quarter-finals)
 Nozomi Okuhara (final)
 He Bingjiao (semi-finals)

Finals

Top half

Section 1

Section 2

Bottom half

Section 3

Section 4

Men's doubles

Seeds

 Marcus Fernaldi Gideon / Kevin Sanjaya Sukamuljo (champions)
 Li Junhui / Liu Yuchen (quarter-finals)
 Liu Cheng / Zhang Nan (semi-finals)
 Takeshi Kamura / Keigo Sonoda (second round)
 Chen Hung-ling / Wang Chi-lin (first round)
 Kim Astrup / Anders Skaarup Rasmussen (quarter-finals)
 Mads Conrad-Petersen / Mads Pieler Kolding (first round)
 Fajar Alfian / Muhammad Rian Ardianto (first round)

Finals

Top half

Section 1

Section 2

Bottom half

Section 3

Section 4

Women's doubles

Seeds

 Yuki Fukushima / Sayaka Hirota (second round)
 Misaki Matsutomo / Ayaka Takahashi (semi-finals)
 Chen Qingchen / Jia Yifan (second round)
 Greysia Polii / Apriyani Rahayu (quarter-finals)
 Mayu Matsumoto / Wakana Nagahara (final)
 Shiho Tanaka / Koharu Yonemoto (second round)
 Lee So-hee / Shin Seung-chan (champions)
 Jongkolphan Kititharakul / Rawinda Prajongjai (second round)

Finals

Top half

Section 1

Section 2

Bottom half

Section 3

Section 4

Mixed doubles

Seeds

 Zheng Siwei / Huang Yaqiong (champions)
 Wang Yilü / Huang Dongping (final)
 Tontowi Ahmad / Liliyana Natsir (quarter-finals)
 Tang Chun Man / Tse Ying Suet (first round)
 Mathias Christiansen / Christinna Pedersen (first round)
 Zhang Nan / Li Yinhui (second round)
 Chan Peng Soon / Goh Liu Ying (second round)
 Yuta Watanabe / Arisa Higashino (semi-finals)

Finals

Top half

Section 1

Section 2

Bottom half

Section 3

Section 4

References

External links
 Tournament Link

China Masters
Fuzhou China Open
Fuzhou China Open
Fuzhou China Open